The Signia by Hilton San Jose  is an 805-room high-rise hotel at 170 South Market Street in San Jose, California, located on the Plaza de César Chávez in Downtown San Jose. Opened in 1987 as the Fairmont San Jose, the hotel closed on March 5, 2021, and filed for a Chapter 11 reorganization. It reopened as a Hilton property on April 7, 2022.

Description

There is a swimming pool and associated deck on rooftop, with a specially designed windscreen to create a microclimate designed to be acceptable for sunbathing and swimming.  The analysis of this rooftop environment was carried out in the early planning stages using a computer simulation of air flow in the presence of the then existing and proposed Fairmont structures. There is also an indoor cabana/bar on the rooftop.

The 13-story, 264 room annex was constructed on the site of the historic Hotel Montgomery, that was moved  to the south and restored to what is now the Four Points by Sheraton San Jose Downtown hotel at a cost of US$8.5 million.

On March 5, 2021, FMT SJ LLC (the hotel owners) filed for Chapter 11 reorganization, temporarily closing the hotel while it sought a new management partner and extended the existing mortgage debt. As a result of the COVID-19 pandemic, occupancy had been less than 7%, and the hotel lost at least $18 million in 2020 and was projected to lose at least another $20 million in 2021, according to the hotel owner. It reopened as a Hilton property on April 7, 2022.

References

External links

 Signia by Hilton San Jose official site

Hotels in San Jose
San Jose
Swig Company
Tourist attractions in the San Francisco Bay Area
Skyscrapers in San Jose, California
Skyscraper hotels in California
Hotels established in 1987
Hotel buildings completed in 1987